Under the Surface is an album by Marit Larsen, and also its title track. The phrase may also refer to:
Under the Surface, an album by Christopher
"Under the Surface", a song by Lacuna Coil from the album Black Anima

See also
 Submarine (disambiguation)